Ashmina is a 2018 Nepali-British short film written and directed by Dekel Berenson. It is produced by Dekel Berenson, Merlin Merton, and Dominic Davey under the banner of 168 Wardour Filmworks. It stars Dikshya Karki in the lead role alongside Prakat Pageni, Sadhana Bhandari, Sebastian Seitz, Ramona Swhajor, Sachin Ragme, Shyam Khadka, and Charlotte Stade.

Cast 

 Dikshya Karki as Ashmina
 Prakat Pageni as Ashmina's Father
 Sadhana Bhandari as Ashmina's Mother
 Sebastian Seitz as David's Friend
 Ramona Swhajor as David's Friend
 Sachin Ragme as Ashmina's Brother
 Shyam Khadka as Money Exchange Clerk
 Charlotte Stade as David's Friend

Reception

Awards and nominations

References

External links 

 

Nepalese short films
Films shot in Pokhara
Nepalese drama films
2010s Nepali-language films